Lucky Losers is a 1950 comedy film starring The Bowery Boys. The film was released on May 14, 1950 by Monogram Pictures and is the eighteenth film in the series. It had the working title of High Stakes.

Plot
Slip and Sach's boss, David J. Thurston, has allegedly committed suicide.  Slip finds a book of matches with the name of a local nightclub on his boss' desk and finds out from Gabe that a casino is being run out of it.  Slip comes to the conclusion that the club had something to do with his boss' death and sets out to find his murderer.

The boys get jobs at the club and Louie poses as a rich cattleman as they gather the information to convict the murderers.

Cast

The Bowery Boys
Leo Gorcey as Terrance Aloysius 'Slip' Mahoney
Huntz Hall as Horace Debussy 'Sach' Jones
William Benedict as Whitey
David Gorcey as Chuck
Buddy Gorman as Butch

Remaining cast
Gabriel Dell as Gabe Moreno
Bernard Gorcey as Louie Dumbrowski
Hillary Brooke as Countess
Lyle Talbot as Bruce McDermott
Harry Cheshire as Chick
Joe Turkel as Johnny Angelo

Notes
Producer Jan Grippo was a professional magician brought to Hollywood to teach Veronica Lake to be convincing doing card tricks in This Gun for Hire. He later became Leo Gorcey's agent and produced the Bowery Boys series. He performed the card and dice tricks seen in the film.

Home media
Warner Archives released the film on made-to-order DVD in the United States as part of "The Bowery Boys, Volume One" on November 23, 2012.

References

External links

1950 films
Bowery Boys films
American black-and-white films
1950s English-language films
1950 comedy films
Monogram Pictures films
Films directed by William Beaudine
American comedy films
1950s American films